Christopher Renaud (born 29 August 1976) is a former backstroke swimmer from Canada, who competed in two consecutive Summer Olympics for his native country, starting in 1996. His highlights include setting a world record in the short course 50-metre backstroke in 1997, and won several Canadian titles.  He is an alumnus of Bishop Carroll High School.

Renaud was the first Canadian to break the two-minute barrier in the 200-metre backstroke, clocking 1:59.81 at the national championships in 1996, held just after the 1996 Olympics.  He temporarily retired in 1997 to re-examine his career options, however he returned to Canada in 1998 and competed at the 1998 Commonwealth Games.  His father Raymond Renaud played hockey for the Montreal Junior Canadiens in 1967.

See also
 List of Commonwealth Games medallists in swimming (men)
 World record progression 50 metres backstroke

References

1976 births
Living people
Canadian male backstroke swimmers
World record setters in swimming
Medalists at the FINA World Swimming Championships (25 m)
Olympic swimmers of Canada
Sportspeople from Fredericton
Swimmers at the 1995 Pan American Games
Swimmers at the 1996 Summer Olympics
Swimmers at the 2000 Summer Olympics
Commonwealth Games medallists in swimming
Pan American Games bronze medalists for Canada
Commonwealth Games silver medallists for Canada
Commonwealth Games bronze medallists for Canada
Pan American Games medalists in swimming
Swimmers at the 1998 Commonwealth Games
Medalists at the 1995 Pan American Games
Medallists at the 1998 Commonwealth Games